The Leadership Council is a thought leadership, research and leadership advisory body based in the UK. Founded in 2008, the council is chaired by Lord Janvrin and publishes research on leadership issues annually.

Members 

As of November 2011, the Leadership Council consists of the following 16 members:

 Ed Butler, former commander, the British Forces in Afghanistan
 Jonathan Chenevix-Trench, former chairman and chief executive, Morgan Stanley International
 Simon Davies, firmwide managing partner, Linklaters
 Iain Ferguson, former CEO, Tate & Lyle
 Val Gooding, former CEO, BUPA
 Anthony Gordon-Lennox, director, AGL Communications
 Tony Hall, former chief executive, BBC News
 Lord Janvrin (Chairman), deputy chairman, HSBC (UK)
 The Hon. Mary-Jo Jacobi Jephson, former head of crisis management, BP America; former special advisor to U.S. presidents Ronald Reagan and George W. Bush
 Lady Judge, chairman, UK Pension Protection Fund
 The Earl of March, head, Goodwood Group
 Martin Newman (Founder), senior partner, the Leadership Agency
 David Richards, chairman, Aston Martin
 Sir John Scarlett, former chief, British Secret Intelligence Service (MI6)
 Sir Tom Shebbeare, former director, The Prince's Charities
 Lord Watson, broadcaster, politician and advertising executive

Research publications 

The Leadership Council's research is widely cited, and is normally based on interviews with a cross-section of global leaders. The most recent publication, 'Hoping to Rise or Fearing to Fall', included interviews with Lord Browne, Lord Coe, Sir Geoff Hurst, Lord Mandelson, and Sir Stuart Rose.

Power, Perspective, Personality 

Publication Date: July 2008
Research Topic: The strategy for business leaders in political engagement

Not Shaken, But Stirred 

Publication Date: November 2008
Research Topic: The ten commandments for leaders in times of crisis

Seven Types of Confidence 

Publication Date: July 2009
Research Topic: The importance of confidence for leadership

Quick Quick Slow 

Publication Date: July 2010
Research Topic: The balance of short and long term perspectives

Hoping to Rise or Fearing to Fall? 

Publication Date: July 2011
Research Topic: Investigating what motivates leaders

Commentary on Leadership Issues 

In December 2011, members of the Leadership Council were interviewed for the Economist Intelligence Unit's (EIU) Monthly Global Forecast programme. Simon Davies and Lady Judge commented on the future of global law firms and nuclear energy, respectively.

References 

Leadership studies
Research management
Organizations established in 2008
2008 establishments in the United Kingdom
Think tanks based in the United Kingdom